"Spaceship Superstar" is the first official single by the Canadian rock band Prism. The song was written by Jim Vallance. It was also the first single from the band's self-titled debut album. "Spaceship Superstar" reached No. 63 on the Canadian Singles Chart and No. 82 on the Billboard Hot 100 singles chart in the United States.

The song was used as the wake up song for the Space Shuttle Discovery crew members in 2011. In 1978, "Spaceship Superstar" received the Certificate of Honour from Performing Rights Organization of Canada (PROCAN).

Composition
The song was written by Jim Vallance under the pseudonym "Rodney Higgs". He first worked on the song in 1975, but finished in 1977. By the time the song became a hit, Vallance had already left Prism. According to Vallance, the influence on the lyrics of the song came from the George Lucas film Star Wars, which was released as he was writing the song.  Musically the song was influenced by "Autobahn" by Kraftwerk, songs from the album Who's Next by the Who, and "Free Ride" by the Edgar Winter Group.

Versions
The album version of "Spaceship Superstar" is 4 minutes and 9 seconds long, while the single version is only 3 minutes and 20 seconds long (excludes the extensive intro). A live version is included on Live Tonite, which is 4 minutes and 17 seconds long.

Usage
On Sunday March 6, 2011 Prism's "Spaceship Superstar" was chosen as the wake up song for the Space Shuttle Discovery crew members. This was a significant point in history as it was the last day that the crews of Discovery and the International Space Station were together before Discovery returned to Earth in the last mission of Discovery.

Personnel
Prism
Lindsay Mitchellguitar, backing vocals
Ron Tabakvocals
John Hallkeyboards
Jim Vallancedrums
Tom Lavinguitar
Although Ab Bryant is considered the bassist and is pictured on the American cover, he did not take part in the recording.

Session Musicians
Graeme ColemanRoland electric piano
Peter BjerringARP Odyssey synthesizer
Jack Lavinbass
Bruce Fairbairnbacking vocals
David Sinclairbacking vocals

Charts

References

External links
  Discogs

1977 singles
Prism (band) songs
Space rock songs